Rotundaria is a genus of freshwater mussels, aquatic bivalve mollusks in the family Unionidae, the river mussels.

Species
Species within this genus include:
 Rotundaria asperata (I. Lea, 1861)
 Rotundaria aurea (I. Lea, 1859)
 Rotundaria couchiana (I. Lea, 1860)
 Rotundaria houstonensis (I. Lea, 1859)
 Rotundaria infucata (Conrad, 1834)
 Rotundaria kieneriana (I. Lea, 1852)
 Rotundaria kleiniana (I. Lea, 1852)
 Rotundaria nodulata (Rafinesque, 1820)
 Rotundaria petrina (Gould, 1855)
 Rotundaria pustulosa (I. Lea, 1831)
 Rotundaria refulgens (I. Lea, 1868)
 Rotundaria succissa (I. Lea, 1852)
 Rotundaria tuberculata (Rafinesque, 1820)

References

 
Bivalve genera
Taxa named by Constantine Samuel Rafinesque